JUMO is a mobile financial services platform for mobile network operators and banks. The platform facilitates  digital financial services such as credit and savings in emerging markets by way of USSD short codes.

History 
The company was founded in 2015 by CEO Andrew Watkins-Ball and has received undisclosed funding from several digital financial services investors including LeapFrog Investments, Anthemis Group and Vostok Emerging Finance. JUMO started as a mobile financial services startup company under Ghana-based Afb, a finance business providing payroll loans to government and corporate workers and consumer loans to informal and market traders. After its potential to deliver digital financial services over mobile (primarily feature phones) became apparent, it was turned into a standalone business. Through September 2016, it  had delivered more than 10 million loans to customers in 6 countries including Tanzania, Kenya, Zambia, Rwanda and Uganda.

The firm's customers are mostly unbanked merchants and individuals in emerging markets where the amount of active mobile money users is high. According to Watkins-Ball, "A $20 loan that can be accessed without collateral in the middle of the night in a rural village can mean the difference between getting a sick person to hospital and going without medical care." JUMO works with mobile network operators including Airtel, MTN Group and Tigo (Millicom) to make credit decisions for each loan application by drawing on non-traditional data points such as GSM records and mobile wallet transaction data. The platform leverages an unconventional digital credit model that does not require customers to have prior financial account ownership or a credit history. Loan decisions are automated and the digital credit application process happens over a mobile device with no need for in-person interactions.

In May 2017, the firm was selected for class 4 of Google's Launchpad Accelerator alongside 5 other African companies.
 In July 2017, Amazon EC2 founder Chris Pinkham joined the board as an active independent director of the company.

References

External links 
 

Financial services companies of South Africa
Financial services companies established in 2015
South African companies established in 2015